The family of non-collagenous proteins known as SIBLING proteins, standing for small integrin-binding ligand, N-linked glycoprotein, are components of the extracellular matrix of bone and dentin. Evidence shows that these proteins play key roles in the mineralization of these tissues.

The following are categorized as SIBLING proteins:
 osteopontin (OPN)
 bone sialoprotein (BSP)
 dentin matrix protein 1 (DMP1)
 dentin sialophosphoprotein (DSPP)
 matrix extracellular phosphoglycoprotein (MEPE)

The genes coding for members of the SIBLING protein family are similarly organized and are all located on human chromosome 4q21-23.

References

Glycoproteins
Extracellular matrix proteins
Protein families